Steve Ludlam may refer to:
 Steve Ludlam (footballer)
 Steve Ludlam (engineer)